Ben More or Beinn Mhòr may refer to:

Hills in Scotland

Ben More
 Ben More (Crianlarich), 1174 m
 Ben More (Mull), 966 m
 Ben Mor Coigach, 743 m
 Ben More Assynt, 998 m

Beinn Mhòr
 Beinn Mhòr (Cowal), 741 m
 Beinn Mhòr (South Uist), 620 m
 Beinn Mhòr (Grantown), 471 m, a hill in the Southern Highlands
 Beinn Mhòr (Islay), 202 m, a hill on the Scottish Islands
 Beinn Mhòr (Lewis), 572 m, a hill on the Scottish Islands
 Beinn Mhòr (North Uist), 190 m, a hill on the Scottish Islands

See also
 Binn Mhór (661 m), a mountain in the Maumturks in Connemara, Ireland
 Binn Mhór (333 m), a mountain in the Twelve Bens, in Connemara, Ireland
 Ben Moor (disambiguation)
 Ben Moore (disambiguation)
 Benjamin Moore (disambiguation)
 Benmore (disambiguation)